United Nations Security Council Resolution 1751 was unanimously adopted on 13 April 2007.

Resolution 
Acting under Chapter VII of the United Nations Charter this morning, the Security Council extended the mandate of the United Nations Organization Mission in the Democratic Republic of the Congo (MONUC) until 15 May 2007.

Taking that action by its unanimous adoption of resolution 1751 (2007), the Council noted that the situation in the Democratic Republic of the Congo continued to pose a threat to international peace and security in the region.

The Council reaffirmed its commitment to the sovereignty, territorial integrity and political independence of the Democratic Republic of the Congo, and to its continued contribution to the consolidation of the country’s peace and stability in the post-transition period, in particular through MONUC.

See also 
List of United Nations Security Council Resolutions 1701 to 1800 (2006–2008)

References

External links
Text of the Resolution at undocs.org

 1751
April 2007 events
2007 in the Democratic Republic of the Congo
 1751